A binary cycle is a method for generating electrical power from geothermal resources and employs two separate fluid cycles, hence binary cycle. The primary cycle extracts the geothermal energy from the reservoir, and secondary cycle converts the heat into work to drive the generator and generate electricity.

Binary cycles permit electricity generation even from low temperature geothermal resources (<180°C) that would otherwise produce insufficient quantities of steam to make flash power plants economically viable. However, due to the lower temperatures binary cycles have low overall efficiencies of about 10-13%.

Introduction

In contrast to conventional geothermal power generation methods like dry-steam or flash, which use a single open cycle, a binary cycle has two separate cycles operating in tandem, hence binary cycle. The primary cycle extracts heat from the geothermal reservoir and provides this to the secondary cycle, which converts heat into work (see Heat Engine) to drive a generator and produce electricity. Thermodynamically, binary cycle power plants are similar to coal-fired or nuclear power plants in that they employ Rankine Power Cycles, the main difference being the heat source and the choice of cycle working fluid.

Primary cycle 
The geothermal reservoir's hot in-situ fluid (or geofluid) is produced to the surface via a wellbore, if necessary assisted by a pump. On the surface, the hot geofluid transfers some of its heat to the secondary cycle, via a heat exchanger, thus cooling in the process. The cold geofluid is then reinjected into the geothermal reservoir via a separate wellbore, where it is reheated. The primary cycle is considered an "open" cycle.

Secondary cycle 
Cold high-pressure working fluid is heated and vapourised in a heat exchanger by the hot geofluid. The hot high-pressure vapour is expanded in a turbine before being cooled and condensed in a condenser. To close the loop, the cold low-pressure liquid is repressurised via a feed pump. The secondary cycle is a closed cycle.

The two main secondary cycle configurations are Organic Rankine cycles (ORC) or Kalina cycles, the main difference being the choice of working fluid; an organic fluid (commonly a hydrocarbon or refrigerant) or a water-ammonia mixture respectively.

History 
The earliest example of a binary cycle geothermal power plant is thought to have been located on Ischia, Italy, between 1940-1943. The plant is thought to have used Ethyl Chloride as the working fluid at an effective capacity of 250 kW. However, owing to the Second World War taking place at the same time, not much is known about this particular installation.

Another binary cycle geothermal power plant was taken into operation in 1967 near Petropavlovsk on the Kamchatka peninsula, Russia. It was rated at 670 kW and ran for an unknown number of years, proving the concept of binary cycle geothermal power plants.

As of December 2014, there were 203 binary cycle geothermal power plants across 15 countries worldwide, representing 35% of all geothermal power plants, but only generating 10.4% of total geothermal power (about 1250 MW).

Variations

Dual pressure
The working fluid is evaporated at two different pressure levels, and thus temperatures. This improves efficiency by reducing exergetic losses in the primary heat exchanger by maintaining a closer match between the geofluid cooling curve and the working fluid heating curve.

Dual fluid
Two secondary cycles are operated in tandem, each with a separate working fluid and boiling point. This improves efficiency by reducing the exergetic losses of the heat introduction process, by ensuring a closer match between the geofluid cooling curve and the working fluids' heating curves.

Performance 

The performance of a simple binary cycle and its individual components can be calculated as follows:

Turbine 

  is the rate of work done by the turbine, in kW
  is the mass flow rate of working fluid, in kg/s
  is the turbine efficiency, non-dimensional
  is the specific enthalpy of the working fluid at the turbine inlet, in kJ/kg
  is the specific enthalpy of the working fluid at the turbine outlet, assuming isentropic expansion in the turbine, in kJ/kg

Condenser 
The equation below can be used to determine the condenser duty and mass flow rate of coolant required.
   

  is the rate of heat removed from the working fluid in the condenser, in kW
  &  are the specific enthalpy of the working fluid at the condenser inlet and outlet respectively, in kJ/kg
  is the mass flow rate of coolant, in kg/s
  &  are the specific enthalpy of coolant at the condenser inlet and outlet respectively, in kJ/kg

Feed Pump 
   

  is the rate of work done by the pump to repressurise the working fluid, in kW
  is the specific enthalpy of the working fluid at the feed pump outlet, assuming isentropic compression, in kJ/kg
  is the specific enthalpy of the working fluid at the feed pump inlet, in kJ/kg
  is the pump efficiency, non-dimensional

Primary Heat Exchanger 
The equation below can be used to determine the primary heat exchanger duty and mass flow rate of geofluid required.
   
  is the rate of heat added to the working fluid within the primary heat exchanger, kW
  is the specific enthalpy of the working fluid at the primary heat exchanger inlet, in kJ/kg
  is the mass flow rate of geofluid, in kg/s
  &  are the specific enthalpy of the geofluid at the primary heat exchanger inlet and outlet respectively, in kJ/kg

Efficiency 
There are a number of different definitions of efficiency that may be considered; these are discussed below.

First law efficiency 
The first law efficiency (from the First law of thermodynamics) is a measure of the conversion of the heat provided to the cycle into useful work. When accounting for real life losses and inefficiencies, real binary cycle geothermal plants have a first law efficiency of between 10-13%.

Carnot efficiency 

The Carnot efficiency gives the efficiency of an ideal thermodynamic cycle, operating between two reservoirs of different temperatures, as such it provides a theoretical maximum to the efficiency of any heat engine. For this reason, a geothermal power plant producing hot geofluid at 180°C (≈450 K) and rejecting heat at 25°C (≈298 K) has a maximum efficiency of just 34%.
 
  &  are the hot and cold absolute temperature respectively, in K

Second law efficiency 
The second law efficiency (from the Second law of thermodynamics) is a measure of the utilisation of the ideally maximum work available and conversion into useful work.
    
  is the exergy rate of geofluid, in kW.
 ,  &  are the specific enthalpy, in kJ/kg, the specific entropy, in kJ/kg/K and the absolute temperature, in K, of the geofluid at the local reference condition. This could be local ambient, wet-bulb or reinjection conditions.

Working fluid selection

The working fluid plays a pivotal role in any binary cycle and must be selected with care. Some criteria for selecting a suitable fluid are given below.

A critical temperature and pressure above the cycle maximum temperature and pressure - most of the heat is transferred at the maximum temperature, increasing efficiency. 
A saturation dome that resembles an inverted U - this prevents liquid drop out in the turbine, which reduces efficiency, damages the turbine blades and thus reduces the turbine's lifetime.
High thermal conductivity - improves the heat transfer in the primary heat exchanger and the condenser, reducing the total heat transfer area required and therefore cost of the plant.
Environmental compatibility - non-toxic, non-carciogenic, low global warming potential, low ozone depletion potential, non-flammable, chemically inert.
Low cost and readily available.

Power plants 
There are numerous binary cycle power stations in commercial production.

Organic Rankine cycle 
Olkaria III, Kenya
Mammoth Lakes, California, United States
Steamboat Springs (Nevada), United States
Te Huka Power Station, New Zealand 
Kirchstockach (Munich), Germany
Traunreut, Germany

Kalina cycle 

 Husavik Power station
 Geothermie Unterhaching

See also
Geothermal electricity
Working fluid
Organic Rankine cycle
Kalina cycle

References

Geothermal energy